A sugar bowl is a small bowl designed for holding sugar or sugar cubes, to be served with tea or coffee in the Western tradition, that is an integral part of a tea set.

Notable sugar bowls 
 Gustav IV Adolf of Sweden presented a pair of silver sugar bowls to Johan Sederholm, his godfather, in 1796.
 The Fondazione Palazzo Coronini Cronberg Foundation of Gorizia has a Venetian sugar bowl of the Napoleonic period.
 The book series A Series of Unfortunate Events by Lemony Snicket, as well as the second and third seasons of its Netflix adaptation, come to center around retrieving a mysterious Sugar Bowl, or "vessel for disaccharides". What the Sugar Bowl contains or why it is so important remains shrouded in mystery in the books, although both of these are revealed in the final episodes of the third season.
 In We Have Always Lived in the Castle by Shirley Jackson the sugar bowl is a prominent object used to poison and murder members of the Blackwood Family.

References 

Teaware
Coffeeware